Exact may refer to:

 Exaction, a concept in real property law
 Ex'Act, 2016 studio album by Exo
 Schooner Exact, the ship which carried the founders of Seattle

Companies
 Exact (company), a Dutch software company
 Exact Change, an American independent book publishing company
 Exact Editions, a content management platform

Mathematics
 Exact differentials, in multivariate calculus
 Exact algorithms, in computer science and operations research
 Exact colorings, in graph theory
 Exact couples, a general source of spectral sequences
 Exact sequences, in homological algebra
 Exact functor, a function which preserves exact sequences

See also

Exactor (disambiguation)
XACT (disambiguation)
EXACTO, a sniper rifle